Lygropia shevaroyalis is a moth of the family Crambidae. It is found in southern India.

This species has a wingspan of 34 mm.

References

Moths described in 1908
Lygropia